Elisabeth Dane (9 January 1903 – 12 March 1984), was a German biochemist.

Life
Elisabeth Dane was born on 9 January 1903 in Mayen, German Empire. She graduated from gymnasium in Munich in 1923. She attended the Universities of Freiburg, Munich and Berlin before earning her Ph.D. in chemistry from the latter institution. That same year she became assistant to the Nobel Laureate, Heinrich Otto Wieland. Dane qualified as a Privatdozentin in 1934 and began to direct the chemical practicum and seminar for medical scientists in 1939. She was appointed as an adjunct professor in 1941 despite not being a member of the Nazi Party. The following year she was appointed professor and conservator-restorer. She died in Munich on 12 March 1984.

Activities
Dane's dissertation was on the composition of the alkaloids in Lobelia inflata and a shortened version was published that same year in the journal . Working with Wieland, she researched the structure and composition of steroids and later worked on the constitution of bile. "With the aid of a cycloaddition, the Diels-Alder reaction, she was able to synthesize the tetracyclical system of steroids. In 1938 she was awarded the Carl-Duisberg prize for the work on female sexual organs that she published with J. Schmidt."

Notes

References

1903 births
1984 deaths
German biochemists
German women biochemists